Olive Township is the name of some places in the U.S. state of Michigan:

 Olive Township, Clinton County, Michigan
 Olive Township, Ottawa County, Michigan

See also 
 Oliver Township, Michigan (disambiguation)

Michigan township disambiguation pages